"Grapevine Fires" is a song by American indie rock band Death Cab for Cutie, the fourth single from their sixth studio album, Narrow Stairs, released February 3, 2009 on Atlantic Records.

The single peaked at number twenty-one on the Billboard Hot Modern Rock Tracks chart, and becoming the band's sixth single on that chart. "Grapevine Fires" was featured in the NBC drama Heroes" in the episode "Ink", and also appeared on the 2009 compilation album, Change Is Now: Renewing America's Promise.

The drumbeat of the song is modeled after the "Purdie Shuffle", although drummer Jason McGerr says it is more of an emulation, as opposed to a replication, of the famous drum pattern.

Music video

The video of the song is animated and created by Walter Robot. It features a semi-literal interpretation of the lyrics by showing a wildfire and its effect on the lives of the people in the video. The band members make a cameo appearance loading a van. The visual interpretation of the song in the video leaves out the imagery of the second verse of the song.

The video was accepted into the Los Angeles Film Festival where it won the Audience Choice Award for Best Music Video.

Charts

References

2009 singles
Death Cab for Cutie songs
Songs about California
2007 songs
Atlantic Records singles
Songs written by Nick Harmer
Songs written by Jason McGerr
Songs written by Ben Gibbard